The name Dukas or Doukas may refer to:

 Doukas, Byzantine Greek noble clan
 Ektor Doukas (1885–1969), Greek painter
 Paul Dukas (1865–1935), French composer
 Doukas (historian)  (c. 1400 – after 1462), Greek historian
 Vera Ducas executed by Irgun 1948